A Prairie Home Companion is a 2006 American musical comedy film directed by Robert Altman and is his final film. It is a fictional representation of behind-the-scenes activities at the long-running public radio show of the same name. The film received mostly positive reviews and was a moderate box-office success on a small budget. The film features an ensemble cast including Woody Harrelson, Tommy Lee Jones, Garrison Keillor, Kevin Kline, Lindsay Lohan, Virginia Madsen, John C. Reilly, Maya Rudolph, Meryl Streep, and Lily Tomlin.

Plot
In Saint Paul, Minnesota, the long-running live radio variety show A Prairie Home Companion prepares for its final broadcast, unbeknown to the listening audience. The radio station's new parent company has scheduled the show's home, the storied Fitzgerald Theater, for demolition, and dispatched "the Axeman" to judge whether to save the show.

In between musical acts, and under the watchful eye of PI Guy Noir (Kevin Kline), the show's denizens mingle and reminisce, including: the singing Johnson Girls, Yolanda (Meryl Streep), her sister Rhonda (Lily Tomlin), and daughter Lola (Lindsay Lohan); cowboy duo Dusty (Woody Harrelson) and Lefty (John C. Reilly); pregnant PA Molly (Maya Rudolph); the Stage Manager, Makeup Lady, and Sound Effects Man (real life Radio Acting Co. members Tim Russell, Sue Scott, and Tom Keith); and the show's creator and host, Garrison Keillor (often called "GK").

The show is visited by an otherworldly "Dangerous Woman" (Virginia Madsen) in a white trench coat revealed to be Lois Peterson, a listener who died in a car accident while listening to a past broadcast, now returned as the angel Asphodel; she lends comfort to the cast and crew for the show's ending and the death of the elderly Chuck Akers (L. Q. Jones) backstage.

The Axeman (Tommy Lee Jones) arrives and swiftly declares the show too old-fashioned to keep on the air. Asphodel escorts him from the theater to an untimely demise, but the show is still canceled.

Years later, the former cast reunites at Mickey's Diner with plans for a farewell tour. Their lively conversation pauses as Asphodel enters the diner.

Cast

Production notes
To receive insurance for the shoot, Robert Altman had to hire Paul Thomas Anderson as a "backup" director to observe filming at all times and be prepared to take over for Altman in case of his incapacity.

Using the working title The Last Show, principal photography for the film began on June 29, 2005, at the Fitzgerald Theater in St. Paul, Minnesota (the radio show's usual venue), and ended on July 28, 2005.

Reception

Box office
The film grossed $20,338,609 domestically (in a limited release) and $25,978,442 worldwide.

Critical response
A Prairie Home Companion opened the 2006 South by Southwest film festival on March 10, then premiered on May 3, 2006, at the Fitzgerald Theater, which had projection and sound equipment brought in for the purpose. The film's stars arrived in ten horse-drawn carriages. Brian Williams of NBC Nightly News anchored his newscast from neighboring Minneapolis, Minnesota, that night so that he would be able to attend.

Critics' general reaction to the film was favorable. On review aggregator Rotten Tomatoes, the film holds an approval rating of 82% based on 197 reviews, with an average rating of 7.12/10. The website's critics consensus reads: "The final film by the great Robert Altman, A Prairie Home Companion, the big screen adaptation of Garrison Keillor's radio broadcast showcases plenty of the director's strengths: it's got a gigantic cast and plenty of quirky acting and dialogue." Roger Ebert awarded the film four out of four stars, saying, "What a lovely film this is, so gentle and whimsical, so simple and profound", and later added the film to his "Great Movies" list.

Michael Medved (himself a radio host) gave the film one and a half stars out of four, saying, "The entertainment value stands somewhere between thin and nonexistent" and "[it may be] the worst movie ever made that pooled the talents of four (count ‘em – four!) Oscar winners".

Desson Thomson from The Washington Post fell in between, writing in a review headlined "Honey, You Could Ask for More" (a reference to the radio show's theme song) that while the movie had its strengths, it was weaker than it should have been.

Accolades
Streep won the Best Supporting Actress Award from the National Society of Film Critics for her role; Altman was also posthumously nominated for an Independent Spirit Award for Best Director.

Soundtrack 

A Prairie Home Companion is the soundtrack the 2006 film A Prairie Home Companion. It was released on May 23, 2006 via New Line Records.

Track listing

Chart performance

Home media 
The DVD was released on October 10, 2006. Special features included deleted scenes, a behind-the-scenes documentary, and commentary by Altman and Kline. As of 2021, the film has not been released on Blu-ray.

See also
 List of films about angels

References

External links
 
 
 
 

2006 films
2006 comedy films
2000s English-language films
2000s musical comedy films
American musical comedy films
Country music films
Films about angels
Films about radio
Films based on radio series
Films directed by Robert Altman
Films set in Minnesota
Films shot in Minnesota
Works by Garrison Keillor 
2000s American films